The Aussie trimaran is a day-racing sailboat designed by Ray Kendrick to conform to International 3 metre sailing class rules. It is sold in plan form.

See also
 List of multihulls

References

Trimarans